Alfred Jeyaratnam Wilson ( 1928 – 31 May 2000) was a Sri Lankan Tamil academic, historian and author. He  began his academic career as a lecturer in economics and political science at the University of Ceylon and was the founding professor of political science at the University of Ceylon (1969-72). Later he moved to Canada and was professor of political science at the University of New Brunswick.   University of New Brunswick.

Early life and family
Wilson was born in 1928. He was the son of K. R. Wilson. He was educated at Royal College, Colombo. He gained B.A. (Hons) (Ceylon), PhD (LSE) and DSc (Economics) (London).

Wilson married Susili, daughter of S. J. V. Chelvanayakam. They had two daughters (Malliha and Maithili) and one son (Kumanan).

Career
Wilson spent a short time as an editorial writer for the Ceylon Daily News. He then taught at the University of Ceylon in Peradeniya for 20 years from 1952 to 1972. He was founding chair of political science at the university in 1969. After Peradeniya Wilson taught political science at the Fredericton campus of the University of New Brunswick (UNB) between 1970 and 1994. After retirement he served as an emeritus professor at the UNB.

Whilst teaching at Peradeniya and UNB Wilson took a number of sabbaticals. He was Leverhulme Research Scholar at the London School of Economics (1955), research fellow in politics at the University of Leicester (1964–65), research associate at McGill University (1970–71), Simon Senior Fellow at the University of Manchester (1971–72), senior research associate at Columbia University (1977) and senior associate member at St Antony's College, Oxford (1977).

Wilson was a constitutional advisor to President J. R. Jayewardene between 1978 and 1983. He was a consultant on South Asia for the State Department. He also worked for the Canadian International Development Agency (CIDA), Canadian Refugees Advisory Board, Ministry of Multiculturalism and immigration tribunals in the USA. He served on the editorial boards of The Round Table, The Journal of Commonwealth and Comparative Politics, The Ceylon Journal of Historical and Social Studies, Asian Survey and The Parliamentarian.

Death
Wilson died in his sleep of heart failure at his home in Toronto on 31 May 2000. He was 71. His funeral took place on 3 June 2000.

Works
Wilson was prolific writer – he wrote eight books and over 100 articles.
 Politics in Sri Lanka, 1947–1973 (1974, Macmillan)
 Electoral Politics in an Emergent State: the Ceylon General Election of May 1970  (1975, Cambridge University Press)
 The Gaullist System in Asia (1980, Macmillan)
 The States of South Asia: Problems of National Integration : Essays in honour of W.H. Morris-Jones (1982, Hurst)
 The Break-up of Sri Lanka: The Sinhalese-Tamil Conflict (1988, Hurst)
 S. J. V. Chelvanayakam and the Crisis of Sri Lankan Tamil Nationalism, 1947–1977: a Political Biography  (1994, University of Hawaii Press)
 Sri Lankan Tamil Nationalism: Its Origins and Development in the 19th and 20th Centuries co-authored with A. J. V. Chandrakanthan, (2000, Hurst)
 The Post-Colonial States of South Asia: Democracy, Development and Identity (2001, Palgrave)

References

1928 births
2000 deaths
Academics of the London School of Economics
Academic staff of the University of Ceylon
Academics of the University of Leicester
Academics of the University of Manchester
Alumni of the London School of Economics
Alumni of Royal College, Colombo
Canadian people of Sri Lankan Tamil descent
Columbia University faculty
Fellows of St Antony's College, Oxford
Academic staff of McGill University
People from Northern Province, Sri Lanka
Sri Lankan Tamil academics
Sri Lankan Tamil writers
Academic staff of the University of New Brunswick
Writers from Toronto